The 2017 International GT Open season was the twelfth season of the International GT Open, the grand tourer-style sports car racing founded in 2006 by the Spanish GT Sport Organización. It began on 29 April at Autódromo do Estoril and finished on 29 October, at Barcelona after seven double-header meetings.

Entry list

Race calendar
A seven-round provisional calendar was revealed on 4 October 2016. The Hungaroring round will be co-headlined by the TCR International Series.
Bold indicates overall winner.

Standings

Drivers' Championship

Teams' Championship

Reference:

Notes

References

External links
 

International GT Open
International GT Open seasons